The 1954 LSU Tigers football team represented Louisiana State University during the 1954 college football season.  Under head coach Gaynell Tinsley, the Tigers had a record of 5–6 with a Southeastern Conference (SEC) record of 2–5.  It was Tinsley's final season as head coach at LSU.

Schedule

Awards
Sid Fournet: All-American – AP, Look, Colliers, INS, NEA, UP;  ALL-SEC

References

LSU
LSU Tigers football seasons
LSU Tigers football